The Bishop of Madagascar was  the Ordinary of the Anglican Church in Madagascar from 1874  until the Diocese was split into three in 1969.

Assistant bishops

Grosvenor Miles was an assistant bishop of the diocese from 1938 to 1960. Jean Marcel was an assistant bishop from 1956 until he became diocesan bishop in 1961.

References

Anglicanism in Madagascar
1874 establishments in Madagascar